Sablay Ka Na, Pasaway Ka Pa is a 2005 Philippine romantic comedy film directed by Willy Milan. The film stars Mikey Arroyo, Ethel Booba and Katrina Halili.

Cast
 Mikey Arroyo as Eric
 Ethel Booba as Becky
 Katrina Halili as Raven
 Ana Leah Javier as Nicole
 Al Tantay as Don Ruben
 Salbakuta as Buraot Boys
 Pekto as Anton
 John Apacible as Chino
 Renee Summer as Yayo
 Gerardo Espina Jr. as Rax
 Manjo del Mundo as Joman
 Levi Ignacio as Jet Li
 Chino Pamintuan as Benjo
 Inday Garutay as Melay
 Winfa Panganiban as Jenny
 Christian Lorenzo as Lester
 Jay Perillo as Jason
 D'Pards as Lupin Boys

Release
The film premiered at the gym of the Naval Institute of Technology on July 3, 2005. The film was released nationwide in October 2005.

References

External links

2005 films
2005 romantic comedy films
Filipino-language films
Philippine comedy films
Cine Suerte films
Films directed by Willy Milan